The CBSO Centre is the administrative home and rehearsal centre of the City of Birmingham Symphony Orchestra, the City of Birmingham Symphony Choruses (City of Birmingham Symphony Chorus, City of Birmingham Symphony Youth Chorus and City of Birmingham Young Voices), and Birmingham Contemporary Music Group on the corner of Berkley Street and Holliday Street, in Birmingham, England.

It contains a 310-seat auditorium which is also used for public performances and as a hired space for receptions and exhibitions.

Built in 1997 by Associated Architects it retains a façade of Rowe's Lead Works on Berkeley Street by H. Peter Hing (1921–22).

See also
List of concert halls

References
Pevsner Architectural Guides - Birmingham, Andy Foster, 2005,

External links
CBSO Centre Web Site

Concert halls in England
Culture in Birmingham, West Midlands
Classical music in the United Kingdom
Buildings and structures in Birmingham, West Midlands